Šejla Merdanović (born 1997) is a Bosnian alpine ski racer.

She competed at the 2015 World Championships in Beaver Creek, USA, in the slalom.

References

External links
 

1997 births
Bosnia and Herzegovina female alpine skiers
Living people
Place of birth missing (living people)